The 1880 season was the first for the Worcester Worcesters franchise in the National League, having played 1879 in the National Association. The team finished its initial season with a 40–43 record, good for fifth place. Lee Richmond threw a perfect game on June 12, 1880, the first ever perfect game in Major League Baseball history in a 1–0 victory over the Cleveland Blues. On August 20, they became the first major-league team to be no-hit at home when Pud Galvin of the Buffalo Bisons defeated them, 1–0.

Regular season

Season standings

Record vs. opponents

Roster

Player stats

Batting

Starters by position
Note: Pos = Position; G = Games played; AB = At bats; H = Hits; Avg. = Batting average; HR = Home runs; RBI = Runs batted in

Other batters
Note: G = Games played; AB = At bats; H = Hits; Avg. = Batting average; HR = Home runs; RBI = Runs batted in

Pitching

Starting pitchers
Note: G = Games pitched; IP = Innings pitched; W = Wins; L = Losses; ERA = Earned run average; SO = Strikeouts

Relief pitchers
Note: G = Games pitched; W = Wins; L = Losses; SV = Saves; ERA = Earned run average; SO = Strikeouts

References
1880 Worcester Worcesters season at Baseball Reference

Worcester Ruby Legs seasons
Worcester Ruby Legs season
Worcester